The 1876 United States presidential election in Rhode Island took place on November 7, 1876, as part of the 1876 United States presidential election. Voters chose four representatives, or electors to the Electoral College, who voted for president and vice president.

Rhode Island voted for the Republican nominee, Rutherford B. Hayes, over the Democratic nominee, Samuel J. Tilden. Hayes won the state by a margin of 19.06%.

With 59.29% of the popular vote, Rhode Island would be Hayes' fourth strongest victory in terms of percentage in the popular vote after Vermont, Nebraska and Kansas.

This was the only election between 1860 and 1888 where the Democratic candidate earned more than 40% statewide, as well as the only election in the same period where the Democratic candidate earned more than 40% in at least one Rhode Island county.

Results

See also
 United States presidential elections in Rhode Island

References

Rhode Island
1876
1876 Rhode Island elections